This is an incomplete list of battles fought by the Ghaznavids.

( Color legend for the location of the battle )

References

Sources

Ghaznavid